Betty or Elizabeth Williams may refer to:

People 
Elizabeth Williams Champney (1850–1922), American author
Elizabeth Langdon Williams (1879–1981), American astronomer and computer
Elizabeth Williams (educationist) (1895–1986), British mathematician
Betty Mabel Lilian Williams (1919–1974), English pulp fiction author and screenwriter, wrote as Dail Ambler and Danny Spade
Betty Jane Williams (1919–2008), American aviator
Elizabeth Williams (photographer) (born 1924), African-American photographer
Betty Williams (peace activist) (1943–2020), Nobel Peace Prize recipient from Northern Ireland
Betty Williams (politician) (born 1944), Welsh Labour Party politician and MP
Betty Smith Williams, African-American nurse
Elizabeth Williams (producer) (born 1949/1950), American academic and theater producer
Elisabeth Omilami (born 1951), née Elisabeth Williams, human rights activist, actress and writer
Elizabeth Williams (artist) (fl. 1980s–2010s), American courtroom artist
Liz Williams (born 1965), British science fiction writer
Emma Kennedy (born 1967), née Elizabeth Emma Williams, TV presenter
Lizzie Williams or Elizabeth Williams (born 1983), Australian cyclist
Elizabeth Williams (basketball) (born 1993), American basketball player
Betty Williams (died 1961), victim in the Kiss and Kill homicide
Buffy Williams (Elizabeth Williams), Welsh Labour Party politician and MS
Elizabeth Whitney Williams (1844–1938), American lighthouse keeper and writer
Elisabeth Williams, American art director, production designer and set decorator

Characters 
Betty Williams (Coronation Street), a character on Coronation Street